is a high school in Yokosuka, Kanagawa Prefecture Japan, founded in 1907. The school is operated by the Kanagawa Prefectural Board of Education.

Notable alumni 
 Politician Junichirō Koizumi, 87th Prime Minister of Japan from 2001 to 2006
 Physicist Masatoshi Koshiba, Nobel Prize winner 2002
 Actor Yōsuke Kubozuka, dropout
 Actor Shunsuke Kubozuka, younger brother of Yosuke Kubozuka
 Judoka Isao Inokuma, Tokyo Olympic Gold Medalist
 Football player Hiroyuki Sakashita
 Football player Shuhei Terada
 Football player Tatsuya Suzuki
 Climatologist Atsumu Ohmura
 Ryo Hazuki from Shenmue
 Okikatsu Arao, colonel of the Imperial Japanese Army
 Takashi Saito, four-star admirals of the Japan Maritime Self-Defense Force, 2nd Joint Staff Office chief of staff
 Coroner Thomas Noguchi
 Anime designer Kazutaka Miyatake

References

External links
  

Educational institutions established in 1908
1908 establishments in Japan
Buildings and structures in Yokosuka, Kanagawa
High schools in Kanagawa Prefecture